Gypsy Woman may refer to:

Films
Gypsy Woman (film), a 2001 film by Steven Knight

Music
"Gypsy Woman" (Crystal Waters song), from the album Surprise (1991)
"Gypsy Woman" (The Impressions song), a 1961 #2 R&B song written by Curtis Mayfield and performed by The Impressions; a 1970 Brian Hyland cover was a #3 pop hit
"Gypsy Woman", a song by Hilary Duff from the album Dignity (2007)
"Gypsy Woman", a song by Rick Nelson
"Gypsy Woman", a song by Eleni Foureira